Arakere  is a village in the southern state of Karnataka, India. It is located in the Shrirangapattana taluk of Mandya district in Karnataka.

Demographics
As of the  2001 India census, Arakere had a population of 9,708 with 4,811 males and 4,897 females.

Post office
There is a post office at Arakere; the postal code is 571415.

Landmarks

 Maraleshwara Temple
 Chennakeshava Temple
 Bisilumaramma Temple
 Arakere Hobli
 Yoganarashima Temple
 Bisilu Maramma festival
Govt Poytechnic

See also
 Mandya
 Districts of Karnataka

References

External links
 http://Mandya.nic.in/

Villages in Mandya district